The Express  is a 2022 Russian tragicomedy film directed by Ruslan Bratov.

Plot
Sasha Soslanov, nicknamed Sos, a charming gouging from the Caucasian province, finds himself in the blackest period of his life. But even when he is expelled from the university, and his beloved Nina leaves for Moscow, he does not lose heart, but goes to the bookmaker's office and makes a desperate bet of several events for the last thousand rubles express (accumulator bet). An incredible combination of circumstances makes him the owner of a big win. That's just the card he loses.

Cast
Lev Zulkarnaev as Sos
Pavel Vorozhtsov as Oleg
Artur Khatagov as Viktor
Olga Smirnova as Nina
Mikhail Khuranov as physical education teacher
Sergey Gaiterov as Gray

Reception

Box office
The Express has grossed US$132 108.

Critical response
Vadim Bogdanov from InterMedia gave the film 8 out of 10, noting the good acting and views of the North Caucasus.

According to Zinaida Pronchenko, Bratov's romanticization of hopelessness is not opposed by a timid guess at all: what if, in the territory called the Russian Federation, life has as many chances to play as death.

As Vasily Stepanov notes, it is immersed in the local context, made from the beginning to the end of the movie.

Awards
 Best Russian Film 2022 according to the Iskusstvo Kino.
 Window to Europe Festival: Best Film, Best Ensemble Cast, Best Cinematography.

References

External links 
 

2022 films
2022 directorial debut films
2020s Russian-language films
Russian crime comedy films
2022 comedy films
Russian crime comedy-drama films